= Peter Jackson bibliography =

This page describes writing about Peter Jackson and his movies.

== Individual films ==
=== King Kong ===
- Morton, Ray (2005). King Kong: The History of a Movie Icon from Fay Wray to Peter Jackson. Hal Leonard Corporation. ISBN 978-1-55783-669-4.

=== The Lord of the Rings Trilogy ===
- Bell, Anita Miller (2009). "The Lord of the Rings" and the Emerging Generation: A Study of the Message and Medium. J. R. R. Tolkien and Peter Jackson. ProQuest. p. 194. ISBN 978-1-109-24676-6.
- Margolis, Harriet; Cubitt, Sean; King, Barry (11 December 2012). Studying the Event Film: The Lord of the Rings. Manchester University Press. ISBN 978-0-7190-7199-7.
- Russell, Gary (2004). The Art of The Lord of the Rings. Houghton Mifflin Harcourt. p. 142. ISBN 0-618-51083-4.
- Sibley, Brian (November 2001). Lord of the Rings -Fellowship of the Ring:Insider's Guide. Collins. ISBN 978-0-00-713194-5.
- Sibley, Brian (2001). The Lord of the Rings Official Movie Guide. HarperCollins Publishers Limited. ISBN 978-0-00-711909-7.
- Sibley, Brian (6 November 2002). The Lord of the Rings: the making of the movie trilogy. Houghton Mifflin Company. ISBN 978-0-618-26022-5.
- Thompson, Kristin (2007). The Frodo Franchise: The Lord of the Rings and Modern Hollywood. University of California Press. ISBN 978-0-520-25813-6.

== Writing about Peter Jackson ==
A list of books and essays about Peter Jackson and his films:

- Sibley, Brian (2006). Peter Jackson: A Film-maker's Journey. HarperCollins Entertainment. ISBN 978-0-00-717558-1.
- Woods, Paul A. (September 2004). Peter Jackson: from gore to Mordor. Plexus. ISBN 978-0-85965-356-5.
